Columbia, also known as the Philip Haxall House, is a historic home located in Richmond, Virginia.  A rare surviving hi-style Federal Villa. The house name is derived from the Columbia Flour Mills which Haxall operated. It was built in 1817–1818, and is a two-story, three bay Federal style brick dwelling on a high basement. The entrance features an elliptical fanlight opening sheltered by a one-story Doric porch. It was added when the entrance was moved from the Lombardy Street side to the Grace Street side in 1924, when the building was expanded to house the T.C. Williams School of Law of the University of Richmond.  In 1834 the Baptist Education Society purchased the house and it became the main academic building of Richmond College, later University of Richmond.  It housed the School of Law from 1917 to 1954.  In 1984 Columbia was purchased by the American Historical Foundation for its headquarters.

It was listed on the National Register of Historic Places in 1982.

References

Houses on the National Register of Historic Places in Virginia
Federal architecture in Virginia
Houses completed in 1818
Houses in Richmond, Virginia
National Register of Historic Places in Richmond, Virginia